Up in the Air is a 2009 American comedy-drama film directed by Jason Reitman and co-written by Reitman and Sheldon Turner. The film is an adaptation of the eponymous 2001 novel by Walter Kirn. Up in the Air was screened as a "sneak preview" at the Telluride Film Festival on September 6, 2009, before its world premiere at the Toronto International Film Festival on September 12, 2009. Up in the Air was released in the United States on December 4, 2009; playing on 15 screens in its first weekend, it grossed over $1.1 million. The film opened nationwide on December 23, 2009, earning over $11 million its first weekend in wide release. The film earned $79 million over 18 weeks in the United States and Canada, with an additional $83 million in overseas markets.

Up in the Air garnered various awards and nominations, with the nominations in categories ranging from recognition of the film itself to its screenplay, direction and editing, to the performance of the three primary actors – George Clooney, Vera Farmiga, and Anna Kendrick. The film received six Academy Award nominations with Farmiga and Kendrick both receiving nominations for Best Supporting Actress, though the film failed to win any of the awards. At the 63rd British Academy Film Awards, Up in the Air won one award – Best Adapted Screenplay, awarded to Reitman and Turner – out of the five for which it was nominated. The Dallas-Fort Worth Film Critics Association named Up in the Air Best Picture and awarded Reitman Best Director and Best Screenplay with Turner. Clooney was given the award for Best Actor. The film also received five nominations at the 67th Golden Globe Awards, with Reitman and Turner taking the award for Best Screenplay. Reitman and Turner also received recognition for the film's screenplay from the Writers Guild of America, where they won the Best Adapted Screenplay award. They received a subsequent twenty more awards and twenty-four nominations overall.

The film garnered five nominations from the Satellite Awards, with Rolfe Kent, the film's score composer, winning the Best Original Score award. Clooney, Farmiga and Kendrick were each nominated for an award at the 16th Screen Actors Guild Awards, but ultimately lost out. Kendrick earned an MTV Movie Award for Best Breakthrough Performance and the Rising Star Award from Palm Springs International Film Festival for her role in the film. Up in the Air won Best Film from eleven awards ceremonies, including the Florida Film Critics Circle, and Vancouver Film Critics Circle. The film earned four nominations for Best Cast from the Broadcast Film Critics Association, and the Washington D.C. Area Film Critics Association, respectively. Costume designer Danny Glicker was nominated for his work by the Costume Designers Guild in the Contemporary Film category. In addition, the film was included on lists of the ten best films of 2009 by Roger Ebert, the American Film Institute, and The New York Times.

Accolades

References

External links
 

Lists of accolades by film